Andres "Andy" Señor Jr. (born September 20, 1974 in Miami, Florida) is an American actor, stage director and filmmaker.

Early life and education 
Andy Señor Jr. was born and raised in Miami, Florida. His parents, both Cuban exiles, worked in the Latin American music industry. They often hosted gatherings at their family house, where musicians, including Gloria Estefan and Jon Secada, would perform. These familial connections would come full circle when, in 2015, Señor served as the associate director on the Broadway production of Gloria Estefan's musical, On Your Feet!

Señor studied Theater at Florida International University, graduating in 1997. In 2015, the university honored him with a Torch Award, noting him as a distinguished alum.

Career 
He made his professional debut in the Tony Award-winning musical RENT as "Angel," playing the role on the stages of Broadway, London, Asia, Los Angeles and US National Tours. Some film and television credits include: Dummy, Lola,  Ed (NBC) and appearances on Regis and Kelly, The Rosie O'Donnell Show, and as a presenter on the Latin Billboard Music Awards Andy also voiced the role of Rembrandt in the 2005 game The Warriors.

Most notably, Señor directed  and produced the historic production of Rent in Havana, Cuba in 2014, marking the first Broadway musical co-production between the United States and the Cuba in 50 years. His documentary Revolution Rent premiered 2019 at DOC NYC, KeyWest Film Festival & Miami International Film Festival and it was released on June 15, 2021, by HBO.

Work

Film

Theatre

References

External links
http://imdb.com/name/nm1307704

1974 births
Living people
Male actors from Miami
American documentary film directors
Florida International University alumni
American theatre directors